Tonya Crowe (born January 24, 1971) is an American actress, best known for playing Olivia Cunningham, the  daughter of Donna Mills's Abby Cunningham, in the CBS prime time soap opera, Knots Landing, a role she played from 1980 to 1990 as well as in the reunion miniseries Knots Landing: Back to the Cul-de-Sac (1997). She received three Soap Opera Digest Awards for Outstanding Actress in a Supporting Role: Prime Time., and well as Young Artist Award for Best Young Actress in a Nighttime Drama Series. Crowe received ten total Young Artist Award nominations during the 1980s for her television performances.

Crowe also had a recurring role on the ABC sitcom Who's the Boss?, and guest starred on CHiPs, Trapper John, M.D. and Seven Brides for Seven Brothers.

Selected filmography
Charlie's Angels (1976) as young Kelly
Women in White (TV Movie) (1979) as Cynthia Rayburn
The Cracker Factory (TV Movie) (1979) as Jenny Barrett
Mother and Daughter: The Loving War (TV Movie) (1980) as Renie, age 8
The Memory of Eva Ryker (TV Movie) (1980) as Little Eva
Knots Landing (Seasons 2–11) (1980–1990) as Olivia Cunningham Dyer
Joshua's World (1980) as Thorpe Torrance 
Dark Night of the Scarecrow (1981) as Marylee Williams
Who's the Boss? (1985-1986) as Robin Fraser
Knots Landing: Back to the Cul-de-Sac (1997) as Olivia Cunningham Dyer

References

External links

American television actresses
American child actresses
Living people
1971 births
21st-century American women